Virgil Dociu (born 3 December 1953) is a Romanian weightlifter. He competed in the men's lightweight event at the 1980 Summer Olympics.

References

1953 births
Living people
Romanian male weightlifters
Olympic weightlifters of Romania
Weightlifters at the 1980 Summer Olympics
Sportspeople from Bucharest
World Weightlifting Championships medalists
20th-century Romanian people